Mcateella is a genus of ash-grey leaf bugs, insects of the family Piesmatidae, first described by Carl John Drake in 1924 The genus name honours Waldo Lee McAtee. The genus is endemic to Australia and is found in all mainland states and territories, with the exception of Victoria and the ACT.

Elias and Cassis state that Mcateella feed not only on Acacias, but on a wide range of plants..

A phylogenetic analysis found that Miespa is a sister taxon of Mcateella, implying  a transantarctic relationship.

Species
, the Australian Faunal Directory accepts the following species:

Mcateella austera 
Mcateella coolgardie 
Mcateella elongata 
Mcateella esperancensis 
Mcateella exocarposa 
Mcateella gibber 
Mcateella interioris 
Mcateella kwoki 
Mcateella reidi 
Mcateella schuhi 
Mcateella splendida

Further reading

References

Piesmatidae
Hemiptera of Australia
Insects described in 1924
Pentatomomorpha genera